Kgaogelo  Moagi (born 31 January 1996), known professionally as Master KG, is a South African musician and record producer. Born and raised in Tzaneen, his debut studio album Skeleton Move achieved acclaim including an AFRIMA Award for Best Artist/Group in the African Electro category. He is also known as the pioneer of "Bolobedu" dance.

His second studio album Jerusalema (2020) was released, containing international successful single: "Jerusalema", featuring Nomcebo Zikode and Burna Boy, was certified diamond by FRA and topped Billboard's World Digital Song Sales chart.

Early life 
Master KG grew up in Calais Village in Limpopo.  He started experimenting with music beats at the age of thirteen using a computer that his late uncle had bought him.

Personal life 
Master KG is in a relationship with musician Makhadzi.

Career 
Master KG's music career started when he got in touch with DJ Maebela and they began experimenting with music software specifically FL Studio. In 2016, after much practice, he released his first single "Situation".

2017–2020: Skeleton Move (2018)
After getting signed to his current record label, Open Mic Productions, he released his chart-topping single "Skeleton Move" featuring Zanda Zakuza.
On 21 September 2018, his debut album Skeleton Move was released. The album features  artists including Zanda Zakuza , Makhadzi, Team Mosha and many others. He sings in his local language Khelobedu, a language spoken by Lobedu People. Master KG has performed in a number of other countries including Zambia. In December 2018, his song "Skeleton Move" was apparently voted Thobela FM's song of the year and sparked controversy as King Monada's fans felt "Malwedhe" (which is King Monada's song) deserved the award.

In December 2019, Master KG released the song "Jerusalema", featuring Nomcebo Zikode. In mid-2020, it went viral online, charting internationally and spawning a remix with Burna Boy. The video of "Jerusalema" was taken down on YouTube on the late hours of 5 August 2020, but was restored on the following day. The song earned him the MTV Europe Music Awards, NJR Music Awards in France, Feather Awards, and African Muzik Magazine Awards. 
He signed a record deal with Elektra France. At 2020 edition  of  African Muzik Magazine Awards  he took-home three awards  Best Male Southern Africa, Best Collaboration, Song of the Year and Artist of the Year Award.

2021–present 
On 26 May 2021, he released  a single  titled "Shine Your Light" with David Guetta featuring  Akon.

In September 2021, he embarked to Jerusalem Live Concert Tour to United Kingdom in support  of his album, toured  with Zanda Zakuza. Around early 2022 he re-united the relationship between him and Makhadzi and crowned it up with Kulakwe as they celebrated the Valentine day together.

Tours

Headlining 
 Jerusalem  Live Concert (2021)

Discography

Albums

Singles

As lead artist 

Others
"Jerusalema" (remix) – Master KG feat. Burna Boy & Nomcebo Zikode (2020)
"Jerusalema" (remix) – Master KG feat. Micro TDH & Greeicy & Nomcebo Zikode (2020) Dali Nguwe

As featured artist

Awards and nominations

See also 
  All Africa Music Awards

References 

Year of birth unknown
21st-century South African male singers
Living people
South African record producers
People from Tzaneen
1996 births
Elektra Records artists